"Wrote a Song About You" is a song by British singer MNEK. The song was released in the United Kingdom on 21 April 2014 as a digital download, as the second single from his debut extended play Small Talk. The song peaked at number 66 on the UK Singles Chart.

Music video
A music video to accompany the release of "Wrote a Song About You" was first released onto YouTube on 23 July 2014 at a total length of three minutes and thirty-two seconds.

Track listing

Chart performance

Weekly charts

Release history

References

2014 singles
2014 songs
MNEK songs
Virgin EMI Records singles
Songs written by MNEK